Wolfsbach may refer to:

 Wolfsbach, Lower Austria, a town in the district of Amstetten in Austria
 Wolfsbach (Vilicher Bach), a river of North Rhine-Westphalia, Germany, tributary of the Vilicher Bach
 Wolfsbach (Seemenbach), a river of Hesse, Germany, tributary of the Seemenbach
 Wolfsbach (Kahl), a river of Bavaria, Germany, tributary of the Kahl